Ralph Leonard "Bucky" Buchanan (December 28, 1922 – April 24, 2005) was a Canadian ice hockey right winger. He played for the New York Rangers of the NHL. He is the father of the NHL player, Ron Buchanan.

External links

1922 births
2005 deaths
Canadian ice hockey right wingers
New York Rangers players
Ice hockey people from Montreal
Canadian expatriates in the United States
20th-century Canadian people